Amontons is a tiny lunar impact crater in the western half of the Mare Fecunditatis. It is a circular, cup-shaped formation that has been excavated out of the level surface by the impact, and is the same dark hue as the surrounding mare. When the sun is at a low angle, multiple ghost-craters are visible in the mare surface to the south-southeast and north of it.

References

External links
 

Impact craters on the Moon